Khvoindizaj (also Romanized as Khvoīndīzaj; also known as Khoi Dīzeh, Khovidizaj, Khow’īn Dīzaj, Khowyendīzaj, Khoy-diz, and Khvoy Dīzéh) is a village in Ozomdel-e Shomali Rural District, in the Central District of Varzaqan County, East Azerbaijan Province, Iran. At the 2006 census, its population was 275, in 65 families.

References 

Towns and villages in Varzaqan County